The Sauveterrian is the name for an archaeological culture of the European Mesolithic which flourished around 8500 to 6500 years BP. The name is derived from the type site of Sauveterre-la-Lémance in the French  of Lot-et-Garonne.

It extended through large parts of western and central Europe. Characteristic artefacts include geometric microliths and backed points on micro-blades. Woodworking tools are notably missing from Sauveterrian assemblages. There is evidence for ritual burial.

References

See also
Tardenoisian

Archaeological cultures of Western Europe
Mesolithic cultures of Europe
Archaeological cultures in France
7th-millennium BC establishments